The Intimate Sessions is an album by Ilse Huizinga with pianist Erik van der Luijt.

Track listing
 "Angel Eyes" (Earl Brent, Matt Dennis) – 2:45
 "They Can't Take That Away from Me" (George Gershwin, Ira Gershwin) – 3:42
 "Don't Explain" (Arthur Herzog, Jr.) – 3:11
 "It Had to Be You" (Isham Jones, Gus Kahn) – 2:11
 "That Old Devil Called Love" (Allan Roberts, Doris Fisher) – 2:23
 "What a Difference a Day Made" (María Méndez Grever, Stanley Adams) – 3:53
 "Cry Me a River" (Arthur Hamilton) – 3:51
 "I Can't Give You Anything but Love, Baby" (Dorothy Fields, Jimmy McHugh) – 2:38
 "Georgia on My Mind" (Hoagy Carmichael, Stuart Gorrell) – 3:42
 "Fly Me to the Moon" (Bart Howard) – 2:39
 "I've Got a Crush on You" (G. Gershwin, I. Gershwin) – 2:11
 "Body and Soul" (Edward Heyman, Robert Sour, Frank Eyton, Johnny Green) – 2:00
 "Our Love Is Here to Stay" (G. Gershwin, I. Gershwin) – 2:34
 "Misty" (Erroll Garner) – 3:30
 "Lover Man (Oh Where Can You Be?)" (Ram Ramirez, Jimmy Davis, James Sherman) – 3:02
 "My Romance" (Richard Rodgers, Lorenz Hart) – 3:05
 "Teach Me Tonight" (Gene De Paul, Sammy Cahn) – 3:11
 "You Don't Know What Love Is" (De Paul, Don Raye) – 2:56
 "Lullaby of Birdland" (George Shearing, B.Y. Foster) – 2:30
 "The Man I Love" (G. Gershwin, I. Gershwin) – 4:21
 "Can't We Be Friends?" (Paul James, Kay Swift) – 3:29
 "I've Grown Accustomed to His Face" (Frederick Loewe, Alan Jay Lerner) – 2:59
 "Embraceable You" (G. Gershwin, I. Gershwin) – 2:03

Personnel
 Ilse Huizinga - vocals
 Erik van der Luijt - grand piano, arranger

References

Ilse Huizinga albums
2006 albums